Fay Na was king of the southern Laotian Kingdom of Champasak from 1791 to 1811. He was promoted by King Rama I of Siam for the noble title "Phra Wichaiyaratkhattiyawongsa" (th: พระวิไชยราชขัตติยวงศา).

Kings of Champasak
Year of death unknown
Year of birth unknown
18th-century Laotian people
19th-century Laotian people
18th-century Thai monarchs